Micro Focus Application Lifecycle Management (ALM) is a set of software tools developed and marketed by Micro Focus (previously Hewlett-Packard and Hewlett Packard Enterprise) for application development and testing. It includes tools for requirements management, test planning and functional testing, performance testing (when used with Performance Center), developer management (through integration with developer environments such as Collabnet, TeamForge and Microsoft Visual Studio), and defect management.

ALM is a combination of a common platform, several key applications and a dashboard targeted at managing the core lifecycle of applications, from design through readiness for delivery to operations. All of these core lifecycle activities are connected together from a workflow perspective with a common management console, layer of project tracking and planning and built on a common software foundation containing a consistent repository and open integration architecture with a supported SDK.

ALM is intended to provide Information Technology departments with a centralized application management platform for managing and automating within and across application teams and throughout the complete process of developing an application, within a single workflow.  Micro Focus offers a number of consulting services to support ALM.

Components

Project planning and tracking
ALM provides project planning and tracking so application development teams can define, track, measure, and report on project milestones and key performance indicators.

Application lifecycle intelligence
Real-time traceability of requirements and defects.

Lab management automation
The Lab Management capability allows testing teams to provision and deploy a test lab themselves in a hybrid delivery environment (bare-metal or virtual, in-house or in the cloud) through integration of ALM with Continuous Delivery Automation (CDA).

Asset sharing and re-use
ALM supports sharable asset libraries that can be reused across projects while maintaining traceability. Specific changes can be applied to shared assets for each project while maintaining library integrity, and projects can re-synch with the library as needed. Cross-project defect collaboration is also supported.

Cross-project reporting
ALM provides cross-project reporting and pre-configured business views for reports such as aggregated project status metrics, application quality metrics, requirements coverage, and defect trends for both an enterprise release and individual projects.

Enterprise Collaboration
HP Enterprise Collaboration uses social media for application development teams to communicate without leaving the ALM environment. Users can import relevant objects (defects, incidents, reports) for participants to review and comment on.

Performance and load testing
Micro Focus LoadRunner Enterprise (formerly known as Performance Center) is a performance testing platform and framework. The platform is used by IT departments to standardize, centralize and conduct performance testing, as well as reuse previous test cases. LoadRunner Enterprise was integrated with ALM (versions 12.6x and prior), but these have now been decoupled and are considered two separate products.

Quality assurance
ALM includes quality assurance features for risk-based test planning and management, version control, baselining, quality release and cycle management, test scheduling and execution, integrated manual testing and defect management.

Micro Focus Quality Center is a quality management platform that can be used for a single project or across multiple IT projects to manage application quality across the entire application lifecycle.  The platform provides requirements management, release and cycle management, test management, defect management and reporting from a single platform.

Requirements definition and management
ALM is used by IT departments to capture, manage and track requirements throughout the application development and testing cycle.

Fortify security
Fortify security software, from Fortify Software, provides application security software, including both dynamic web application security testing and static code analysis. Fortify security software integrates with ALM secure application delivery.

Multi-environment support
ALM can be installed on-site or delivered through the cloud in a software as a service model. ALM is also available for mobile device support, including Apple iPhone and Android mobile devices.

See also
 Application lifecycle management

References

Business software
Application Lifecycle Management